Bedevilled Rabbit is a 1957 Warner Bros. Merrie Melodies short directed by Robert McKimson. The short was released on April 13, 1957, and stars Bugs Bunny. In this cartoon, Bugs is lost in Tasmania, and has to deal with the Tasmanian Devil.

Plot
After a box of carrots is dropped into the middle of a jungle in Tasmania, Bugs pops out, wondering how he went from sleeping in a carrot patch to the middle of Tasmania. Suddenly, a group of animals (both wild and domesticated) come running through the woods, scared for their lives (Bugs mistakes it for "chow time at the zoo"). A crocodile (who turns himself inside out into a bag for a disguise) hands Bugs a booklet talking about the Tasmanian devil and the many things it eats. Bugs reads: "Beware of the Tasmanian Devil, a vicious, ravenous brute with powerful jaws like a steel trap. Eats aardvarks, ants, bears, boars, cats, bats, dogs, hogs, elephants,  antelopes, pheasants, ferrets, giraffes, gazelles..." Bugs snarks, "A likely story, but there ain't no such animal."

While Bugs is going through the list from stoats, goats, shoats, ostriches, etc., the Tasmanian Devil comes roaring in and spots Bugs Bunny still reading the booklet as he completes the list from octopuses, penguins, wigeons (which Bugs reads as people), warthogs, yaks, newts, walruses, gnus, wildebeests, and then states "What?! No rabbits?!" The Tasmanian devil greedily says that it 'especially' eats rabbits as it turns to the page that says "...And Especially Rabbits" and eats the booklet. Bugs is able to temporarily fool Taz into thinking he is a monkey, which Tasmanian devils do not eat (despite the fact that one of the animals seen running for its life was a monkey - ostensibly because all animals are scared of Taz). However, Taz soon starts chasing Bugs again, and Bugs tags the Tasmanian Devil saying, "Tag! You're it, Baggy Eyes!", And the chase is on again. Bugs tricks "Baggy Eyes" into getting crushed under a tree but Taz manages to exit through a knothole in the tree. Bugs jokes around wondering what Tasmanian devil pancakes would taste like, but he accidentally lets his guard down and Taz grabs Bugs by his ears and asks him: "What for you say you monkey, when you got little powder puff tail like rabbit, Rabbit?"

Bugs ends up on a spit, trussed like a roast pig, as Taz puts salt and pepper on Bugs, which results in Bugs sneezing the apple out of his mouth. Bugs is really nervous, because he is about to be eaten and has no escape plan, but luckily he sees Taz making a large salad to go with him (with turtles, squirrels, etc.). Bugs compliments Taz on his "mean salad" but informs him that the best thing to have with a salad is "wild turkey surprise", not rabbit. Taz, wanting to try it, unties Bugs. Bugs throws some sticks of dynamite together, lights the fuses and dresses the 'legs' up to look like they are from a turkey. Taz gobbles the dish, but does not seem too harmed from the explosion in his stomach.

When Taz starts chasing Bugs again, Bugs runs into a store owned by a "Trader Mac" and pulls some items off the shelf to dress himself up as a Tasmanian she-devil, whom Taz goes gaga over. Bugs 'makes out' with Taz and, with a bear trap for lips, gives him a big kiss, driving Taz wild. This causes the real Tasmanian she-devil (whom Taz married at the end of Devil May Hare in 1954) to come in and smack him across the head with her rolling pin. Bugs comments: "She's a nice lady. Yeesh!"

Home media
Bedeviled Rabbit is available, uncensored and uncut, on the Bugs Bunny Super Stars DVD: Hare Extraordinare DVD. However, it is cropped to widescreen. It is also shown uncensored, full screened and uncut, on the Looney Tunes Platinum Collection: Volume 1 Blu-ray & DVD set.

References

External links

 

1957 films
1957 animated films
1957 short films
Merrie Melodies short films
Warner Bros. Cartoons animated short films
Films directed by Robert McKimson
Films scored by Milt Franklyn
Bugs Bunny films
Tasmanian Devil (Looney Tunes) films
Films set in Tasmania
1950s Warner Bros. animated short films
Films produced by Edward Selzer
Films set in jungles
1950s English-language films